The Battle of Koppam was a battle fought between the Medieval Chola kings Rajadhiraja Chola and Rajendra Chola II with the Chalukya king Someshvara I in 1054, or in 1052 CE according to Sen. The site of the battle has been identified as Koppal by C.R. Krishnamacharlu and this has been accepted by Sastri and Dr. B.R Gopal. Though the cholas was successful in the battle, Chola king and supreme commander, Rajadhiraja I lost his life in the battlefield and was succeeded to the throne by his younger brother, Rajendra Chola II.

Sources 

The main historic sources of the battle are an inscription dated to 1054 and Rajendra Chola's Manimangalam record of 1055.

Causes 

Since his accession to the throne, Rajadhiraja Chola desired to subjugate the Chalukyas who ruled over portions of Northern Karnataka and the southern part of present-day Maharashtra and incorporate their territories into the Chola Empire.  His first invasion of the Chalukya kingdom in 1047-48 had failed. In 1054, he led a second expedition into the Chalukya territories which met the Chalukya army and fought a battle at place mentioned as "Koppam".

Events 

In 1054, Rajadhiraja led a huge army northward and plundered the province of Rattamandalam. His army was followed in the rear by forces under Rajadhiraja's brother and heir-apparent, Rajendra II. The Chalukya king Someshvara I prepared to meet his enemy and a pitched battle was fought at Koppam. The Chola troops were holding the upper hand when Chalukyan archers shot Rajadhiraja mortally wounding him. The Chola troops panicked and began to retreat when Rajendra II, commanding the reserve forces, personally took command of the army and rallying the Chola forces together, inflicted heavy losses on the Chalukya army forcing Someshvara I to flee. Chola sources record that the elephants, horses and camels of the Chalukyas, along with a huge booty and the queens of Someshvara I fell into the hands of the Cholas. Rajendra II, reportedly, crowned himself on the battlefield and erected a victory pillar at Kolhapur before returning to his country.

Identification of Koppam 

The Manimangalam inscription state that Koppam was a city on "the Great River". Fleet has identified it with Khidrapur, 30 miles south-east of Kolhapur, thereby assuming the "Great River" to be the Krishna, while other historians have identified Koppam with a place near Maski.

References

 

11th century in India
Koppam
Koppam
1054 in Asia